Indigo (born Alyssa Ashley Nichols, June 25, 1984, Los Angeles) is an American actress and DJ. She is best known for her roles as Rona, one of the vampire slayer potentials, in the final season of the TV series Buffy the Vampire Slayer, and Vaneeta on the Showtime series Weeds, in which she was nominated for the 13th Annual Screen Actors Guild Awards, for Outstanding Ensemble in a Comedy Series.

Personal life
Indigo is married to Jneiro Jarel.

Filmography

References

External links
 

American television actresses
American voice actresses
Living people
African-American actresses
American film actresses
1984 births
21st-century African-American people
21st-century African-American women
20th-century African-American people
20th-century African-American women